Supervivientes 2021: Perdidos en Honduras is the sixteenth season of the show Supervivientes and the twentieth season of Survivor to air in Spain and it will be broadcast on Telecinco during Spring 2021. This season will repeat the same host panel from the previous season: Jorge Javier Vázquez will be the main host at the central studio in Madrid, with Lara Álvarez co-hosting from the island, Jordi Gonzalez hosting a side debate of the program and Carlos Sobera hosting a gala in Cuatro.

Cast
The contestants were announced daily by the network.

Weekly Statics

Nominations

Notes

: Contestants were split into two tribes, "official contestants", who lived in the Pirate Island, and "non official contestants", who lived in the shipwrecked boat. Contestants living in the ship, were not eligible to nominate or be nominated as they need to win their place.
: As the leader of the tribe, Melyssa was given the power to name a nominee.
: The shipwrecked contestants had to vote for one person to move to the island. Carlos was the most voted and Valeria (as the 1st contestant to vote) broke the tie between Agustín, Antonio and Palito, choosing Antonio.
: As the leader of the tribe, Omar was given the power to name a nominee.
: The shipwrecked contestants had to vote for one person to move to the island and another one in negative to stay in the Ship.
: As the leader of the tribe, Melyssa was given the power to name a nominee.
: As the leader of the tribe, Alejandro was given the power to name a nominee.
: The shipwrecked contestants had to vote for one person to move to the island and another one in negative to stay in the Ship. Agustín was the most voted and the Pirate Island contestants broke the tie between Carlos and Sylvia, choosing Carlos.
: Agustín, Alexia, Lara and Sylvia were automatically nominated as they were the remaining contestants from the Shipwreck.
: As the leader of the tribe, Olga was given the power to name a nominee.
: Since this week, all the contestants merged into a tribe.
: As the leader of the tribe, Gianmarco was given the power to name a nominee.
: Lara and Sylvia won the right to nominate one contestant each in a task.
: As the leader of the tribe, Tom was given the power to name a nominee.
: Lara and Sylvia became official contestants and they were not automatically nominated anymore.
: Alejandro received one point in the nominations because of a challenge.
: As the leader of the tribe, Omar was given the power to name a nominee.
: After a challenge, Olga won immunity and Melyssa was automatically nominated.
: There was a tie between Gianmarco and Tom and Lara, as the leader broke it nominating Tom.
: As the leader of the tribe, Lara was given the power to name a nominee.
: Carlos was forced to leave the island after being injured on day 58. After that announcement, the lines were frozen and due to he received the fewest votes so far, he was allowed to be evicted on day 63.
: There was a tie between Lara and Omar, and Olga, as the leader broke it nominating Omar.
: As the leader of the tribe, Olga was given the power to name a nominee.
: There was a tie between Alejandro and Gianmarco, and Olga, as the leader broke it nominating Alejandro.
: As the leader of the tribe, Olga was given the power to name a nominee.
: There was a tie between Gianmarco and Tom, and Olga, as the leader broke it nominating Tom.
: As the leader of the tribe, Olga was given the power to name a nominee.
: There was no nominations or leadership this week, because the remaining contestants from the Exile Island are nominated.
: Alejandro lost his right to nominate in a challenge for the rest of the show.
: There was a tie between Lola and Olga, and Gianmarco, as the leader broke it nominating Olga.
: As the leader of the tribe, Gianmarco was given the power to name a nominee.
: As the leader of the tribe, Gianmarco was given the power to name a nominee.
: As the leader of the tribe, Melyssa was given the power to name a nominee.
: Gianmarco won the last immunity challenge and went through the final vote. Melyssa and Olga were nominated.

Tribes

Ratings

"Galas"

"Conexión Honduras"

"Tierra de Nadie"

References

External links
 

Survivor Spain seasons
2021 Spanish television seasons